Jonathan Evans (born 25 July 1992) is a former Welsh professional rugby union footballer, he most recently played at scrum half for Scarlets in the Pro14. He also represented Newport Gwent Dragons and Bath.

Club career
Evans played his junior rugby and also began his senior career at Bargoed RFC, he had also been a member of the Newport Gwent Dragons academy. Before playing for the Dragons he had played for Welsh Premier Division sides Pontypool RFC and Newport RFC.

Evans made his professional debut for the Newport Gwent Dragons in a Pro12 match against the Ospreys on 7 May 2010, he was at the time the youngest Dragons player ever at 17.

On 24 February 2015, it was announced Evans would join Premiership side Bath from the start of the 2015–16 season. Evans made his first appearance for Bath as a substitute against Newcastle Falcons on 2 January 2016. He scored his first try for Bath in a 16–14 victory over Worcester Warriors. Evans struggled to get game time, and found himself down the pecking order below Chris Cook and Nikola Matawalu. Evans left Bath after making four appearances in his only season at the club.

On 22 February 2016, it was announced Evans would join Welsh region Scarlets at the start of the 2016–17 season.

Evans was released at the end of the 2019–20 season.

International career
Evans is a former Wales U20 international and has played in two U20 Six Nations and Junior World Championships.

References

External links
Newport Gwent Dragons profile
Pontypool RFC profile
Newport RFC profile

1992 births
Living people
Rugby union players from Cardiff
Pontypool RFC players
Dragons RFC players
Scarlets players
Welsh rugby union players
Newport RFC players
Rugby union scrum-halves